The 1932 All-Pacific Coast football team consists of American football players chosen by various organizations for All-Pacific Coast teams for the 1932 college football season. The organizations selecting teams in 1932 included the Associated Press (AP), the Newspaper Enterprise Association, and the United Press (UP).

All-Pacific Coast selections

Quarterback
 Orville Mohler, USC (NEA-1; UP-1)
 Homer Griffith, USC (AP-1)

Halfbacks
 George Sander, Washington State (AP-1; NEA-1; UP-1)
 Hank Schaldach, California (AP-1; NEA-1)
 Sim, Stanford (UP-1)

Fullback
 Joe Keeble, UCLA (NEA-1)
 Angelo Brovelli, St. Mary's (California) (AP-1)
 Krause, Gonzaga (UP-1)

Ends
 Dave Nisbet, Washington (AP-1; NEA-1; UP-1)
 Ray Sparling, USC (NEA-1)
 Frank Slavich, Santa Clara (AP-1; UP-1)

Tackles
 Tay Brown, USC (AP-1; NEA-1; UP-1)
 Ernie Smith, USC (AP-1; NEA-1; UP-1)

Guards
 Bill Corbus, Stanford (AP-1; NEA-1; UP-1) (College Football Hall of Fame)
 Aaron Rosenberg, USC (AP-1; NEA-1) (College Football Hall of Fame)
 Steponovitch, St. Mary's (UP-1)

Centers
 Bernie Hughes, Oregon (NEA-1; UP-1)
 Lee Coates, UCLA (AP-1)

Key

AP = Associated Press

NEA = Newspaper Enterprise Association, based on "tabulation of the choices of sports writers on Pacific Coast"

UP = United Press, selected by staff writers matching their opinions with those of coaches, players and other critics

See also
1932 College Football All-America Team

References

All-Pacific Coast Football Team
All-Pacific Coast football teams
All-Pac-12 Conference football teams